Maxim Romanovich Kuznetsov (: born March 24, 1977) is a Kazakhstani-born Russian former professional ice hockey player. Kuznetsov was drafted in the 1st round (26th overall) by the Detroit Red Wings in the 1995 NHL Entry Draft.

Playing career
After the 1995 draft, Kuznetsov played for the Dynamo Moscow before making the trip to North America. For two games in the 96–97 season and until the end of the 98–99 season he played for the Detroit Red Wings' AHL affiliate, the Adirondack Red Wings. He followed this with a single season playing for the Cincinnati Mighty Ducks before being called up to the NHL in the 00–01 season. Unfortunately, a knee injury suffered in a game against Vancouver caused him to miss much of the remaining season. The following year he found his place with the Wings as a true defenceman and bolstered the already deep blueline, helping the Wings to win the Stanley Cup. He played 39 regular season games, but did not play in the playoffs. His name was left off the Stanley Cup, because he was two games short of 41 minimum required to be engraved on the cup. However, Detroit did award Maxim with a Stanley Cup Ring.

In the latter part of the 02–03 season, Kuznetsov was traded to the Los Angeles Kings along with Sean Avery and two draft picks for Mathieu Schneider. Upon his arrival with the Kings organization, he spent the majority of his playing time with the team's AHL affiliate, the Manchester Monarchs.

On June 7, 2004 Kuznetsov signed as a free agent with Dynamo Moscow (due to the NHL lockout) once again. After playing only ten games for Moscow he was released and then signed as a free agent by SKA Saint Petersburg where he continued to contribute with his hard lined defensive play.

Career statistics

External links
 

1977 births
Living people
Avangard Omsk players
Cincinnati Mighty Ducks players
Detroit Red Wings draft picks
Detroit Red Wings players
Expatriate ice hockey players in Russia
HC Dynamo Moscow players
Kazakhstani ice hockey players
Los Angeles Kings players
Manchester Monarchs (AHL) players
National Hockey League first-round draft picks
People from Pavlodar
SKA Saint Petersburg players
Stanley Cup champions
Traktor Chelyabinsk players
HC Vityaz players
Russian ice hockey defencemen
Kazakhstani people of Russian descent